Vyacheslav Ivanovich Shchyogolev (born 30 December 1940 in Moscow) is a Russian grandmaster in international draughts. He won two Draughts World Championships in 1960 and 1964, as well as four Soviet Union championships (1959, 1963, 1964 and 1976).

He wrote a book From beginner to champion, where he praised draughts for shaping the player as a fighter, scientist and artist.

References

Soviet draughts players
1940 births
Living people
Players of international draughts
Players of Russian draughts